Preben Gustav Dabelsteen (14 October 1925 – 23 January 2017) was a Danish badminton player. He won five Danish doubles Championships with Jørn Skaarup and played on the national team until the mid 1950s.

Medal Record at the All England Badminton Championships

References

1925 births
2017 deaths
Danish male badminton players